The 2006 Mississippi State Bulldogs football team represented Mississippi State University during the 2006 NCAA Division I FBS football season. The team's head coach was Sylvester Croom. The Bulldogs played their home games in 2006 at Davis Wade Stadium in Starkville, Mississippi

Schedule

Game summaries

Alabama

Source: ESPN

References

Mississippi State
Mississippi State Bulldogs football seasons
Mississippi State Bulldogs football